Municipal elections in Richmond Hill, Ontario are held every four years, concurrent with other municipal elections in Ontario.  Historically, elections were held more often.  Elected positions include mayor, regional and local councillor and ward councillors (for six different wards) on the Richmond Hill City Council, as well as trustees for the York Region District School Board, the York Catholic District School Board and for a Conseillere for the Conseil Scholare de District de Centre SudOuest.

1873 election 
The first election in Richmond Hill was held January 6, 1873, just after its incorporation as a village.  The campaign focused on the need to build a new high school as the one built in the 1850s was becoming crowded.

The vote tallies were (elected candidates bolded):

1985 election 
Concurrent with the 1985 election, two plebiscites were held, one relating to the ward system and one relating to Nuclear-free zones.  Voters rejected the new ward system 5057 to 5460 and endorsed the nuclear-free zone declaration 7073 to 3272.  Low voter turnout was credited to the poor weather and the lack of a mayoral race.

1988 election 
The election was held November 14, 1988. Issues in the election included the rapid building of houses in Richmond Hill which many felt had outpaced the growth of corresponding services.  The relationship between the town councillors and developers had also been the subject of controversy.

1991 election 
One of the main issue of the 1991 election was plans to scrap the building of a large civic centre in the downtown area, and instead lease office space in Beaver Creek Industrial Park for that purpose, and build a single purpose library downtown instead of integrating it into a multi-purpose facility.

2003 election 
The 2003 election was held on November 12, 2003.

2006 election 

The election debates centred on urban sprawl, especially with regards to the Oak Ridges Moraine, waste management and urban renewal in the downtown area of Richmond Hill.

2010 election 
The 2010 election was held on October 25, 2010. This was the first election in Richmond Hill where the ballots were tabulated electronically instead of manually. Issues in the election included regional transit planning (e.g. VIVA rapidways, Line 1 Yonge extension), the future of the David Dunlap Observatory, and debt in York Region.

2014 election 
The 2014 election was held on October 27, 2014.

2018 election 
The 2018 election was held on October 22, 2018.

2022 mayoral by-election 

The 2022 mayoral by-election was held on January 18-24, 2022. City council passed By-Law 133-21 on October 13, 2021 authorizing the use of internet voting to accommodate voters for the by-election during the COVID-19 pandemic.

Reasons for the by-election 
Then incumbent mayor Dave Barrow went on indefinite medical leave on February 24, 2021, leaving city council with 8 voting members. According to local media reports, this left city council frequently gridlocked, as there was no leader in council and council votes would often end in a tie. City council meetings were characterized as "dysfunctional", where members would divulge into squabbling and name-calling. 

Barrow returned to preside over a special council meeting on September 8, 2021 regarding the future of the governance of council given the inefficiencies during his absence. Four councillors left the meeting in protest before it was adjourned.  On September 15, 2021, Barrow retired as mayor.

On September 29, 2021, city council agreed to hold a by-election to fill the mayor's vacant seat instead of appointing a mayor.

Candidates
Godwin Chan, incumbent city councillor (Ward 6)
Joe DiPaola, acting mayor and incumbent city councillor 
Susan Korman, CEO, Furry Friends Company
Carmine Perrelli, deputy mayor and regional councillor 
Ruida Tian, Founder/CEO, Smair Inc.
Rona Wang, President & CEO at GoBest Immigration Services
David West, incumbent city councillor (Ward 4) 
Juni Yeung, music teacher, author, cultural historian, and interpreter
Michael Zambakkides, Vice president, Z3 Controls

Results

Voter turnout for this election was 32.10%.

2022 election 
The 2022 election will be held on October 24, 2022.

References 

Municipal elections in Ontario by city
Politics of Richmond Hill, Ontario